The 2007–08 A-League was the 31st season of top-flight soccer in Australia, and the third season of the A-League competition since its establishment in 2004. Football Federation Australia hoped to build on the success of the previous two seasons and on the interest generated by Sydney FC and Adelaide United playing in the 2007 AFC Champions League, and the Socceroos competing in the 2007 AFC Asian Cup.

Based on their A-League 2006-07 season performances Adelaide United and Melbourne Victory competed in the 2008 AFC Champions League, making it two consecutive seasons in the competition for Adelaide United. Based on the 2007–08 season of the A-League, the Central Coast Mariners and Newcastle Jets qualified for the 2009 AFC Champions League, as the competition's Premiers and Champions respectively.

Changes included:
The New Zealand Knights, who folded at the conclusion of the 2006–07 season, were replaced by Wellington Phoenix.
An increase of the squad size, from 20 to 23 players, increasing the salary cap from A$1.6 million to A$1.8 million.

Clubs

Foreign players

The following do not fill a Visa position:
1Those players who were born and started their professional career abroad but have since gained Australian Residency (and New Zealand Residency, in the case of Wellington Phoenix);
2Australian residents (and New Zealand residents, in the case of Wellington Phoenix) who have chosen to represent another national team;
3Injury Replacement Players, or National Team Replacement Players;
4Guest Players (eligible to play a maximum of ten games)

Salary cap exemptions and captains

Pre-Season Challenge Cup 

The pre-season cup competition was held in July and August in the lead up to the start of the A-League season.  The opening round began on 14 July 2007.  The competition featured a group stage, with three regular rounds, followed by a two-week finals playoff.

The pre-season cup was won by Adelaide United at the final on 12 August 2007.

Regular season
The league season took a triple round-robin format over 21 rounds between 24 August 2007 and 20 January 2008 with each team playing the other seven teams three times.

League table

Round 1

Round 2

Round 3

Round 4

Round 5

Round 6

Round 7

Round 8

Round 9

Round 10

Round 11

Round 12

Round 13

Round 14

Round 15

Round 16

Round 17

Round 18

Round 19

Round 20

Round 21

Finals series

Semi-finals

Preliminary-final

Grand Final

Season statistics

Leading scorers

Attendance
The attendance records of each of the teams at the end of the home and away season, does not include finals series attendances.

* Adelaide United played a one off match at the Adelaide Oval against Sydney FC in their Round 18 match. This is why Adelaide United's Highest single attendance exceeds the capacity of Hindmarsh Stadium.

Top 10 attendances

Disciplinary
The Fair Play Award was awarded to Newcastle Jets, the team with the lowest points on the fair play ladder at the conclusion of the home and away season.

Awards 
 The Premiers' Plate was awarded to Central Coast Mariners, who finished on top of the ladder after the regular season.
 The Championship Trophy was awarded to the Newcastle Jets.
 The Johnny Warren Medal was awarded to Joel Griffiths from the Newcastle Jets for the best player in the league.
 The Coach of the Year was awarded to Gary van Egmond of the Newcastle Jets.
 The Joe Marston Medal was awarded to Andrew Durante of Newcastle Jets.
 The Reebok Golden Boot was awarded to Joel Griffiths of Newcastle Jets (12 goals - regular season).
 The Rising Star award was awarded to Bruce Djite of Adelaide United.
 The Fair Play Award was awarded to the Newcastle Jets.

See also
2007 Australian football code crowds
Adelaide United season 2007-08
Central Coast Mariners season 2007-08
Melbourne Victory season 2007-08
Newcastle United Jets season 2007-08
Perth Glory season 2007-08
Queensland Roar season 2007-08
Sydney FC season 2007-08
Wellington Phoenix season 2007-08

References

 
A-League Men seasons
Aus
1
1